Helen Gipson (born 27 September 1961) is a Scrabble player. On 4 December 2005 her ABSP rating peaked at third in Britain, making her the highest rated woman, and she is consistently rated as the top female player in the world.  In January 2009 she won the UK Open beating a strong field including the world champion Nigel Richards.

A software engineer by trade, Gipson represented England in the World Scrabble Championship 1999 (where she finished 49th), 2003 (11th), 2005 (29th and again the top-rated woman), 2007 (15th), 2009 (10th) and 2011 (18th).

Her titles also include British Matchplay Scrabble Championship in 1998.

In 2012 Gipson was the first British player to win the Brands King's Cup in Bangkok, Thailand.

She lives in Scotland.

References

External links
 ABSP ratings on December 4th 2005
 World Scrabble Championship official website entry

 Helen Gipson receiving 2012 King's Cup.

British Scrabble players
Living people
1961 births